Vexillum coronatum is a species of small sea snail, marine gastropod mollusk in the family Costellariidae, the ribbed miters.

Description
The length of the shell varies between 15 mm and 26 mm.

Distribution
This marine species occurs off the Fiji Islands, Guam, the Loyalty Islands and New Caledonia.

References

External links
 Helbling G. S. (1779). Beyträge zur Kenntniß neuer und seltener Konchylien. Aus einigen Wienerischen Sammlungen. Abhandlungen einer Privatgesellschaft in Böhmen, zur Aufnahme der Mathematik, der vaterländischen Geschichte, und der Naturgeschichte, 4: 102-131, pl. 1-4.
  Liénard, Élizé. Catalogue de la faune malacologique de l'île Maurice et de ses dépendances comprenant les îles Seychelles, le groupe de Chagos composé de Diego-Garcia, Six-îles, Pèros-Banhos, Salomon, etc., l'île Rodrigues, l'île de Cargados ou Saint-Brandon. J. Tremblay, 1877.
  Cernohorsky, Walter Oliver. The Mitridae of Fiji; The veliger vol. 8 (1965)

coronatum
Gastropods described in 1779